"wvrdr_error_100<oest-of-th3-gs.gid30n> not found" is the third episode of the seventh season of the American science fiction television series Legends of Tomorrow, revolving around the eponymous team of superheroes and their time traveling adventures. It is set in the Arrowverse, sharing continuity with the other television series of the universe. The episode was written by Phil Klemmer and Matthew Maala, and directed by Caity Lotz, and is the series' 100th episode. It premiered on October 27, 2021, on The CW.

Plot 

Gideon struggles with making decisions and collapses. Unable to reboot her, Astra and Spooner use their powers to enter her mind. Inside, they meet a memory of Jefferson "Jax" Jackson, who is defending her subconsciousness. Gideon is losing her memories, so Astra and Spooner help her remember everything by re-experiencing her memories of the Legends, including Ray Palmer, Carter Hall, Leonard Snart, Martin Stein, Rip Hunter, Nora Darhk and Zari Tomaz. Along the way, Gideon is attacked by a virus of herself who does not want to be human. The virus captures Gideon, corrupts her memories, forces her to re-experience the deaths of several Legends, and reveals that Rip had reprogrammed her to protect the Legends and learn from them. Jax, Astra, and Spooner uncorrupt the memories and show Gideon happier memories, convincing her to embrace her humanity and take control of the virus. She is comforted by all of the Legends and wakes up. Meanwhile, in 2213 Vancouver, the past Bishop has dreams of his future self and the Legends from the alien invasion in 1925. He finds a copy of Gideon that he downloaded and resets her memories, intending to use her against the Legends.

Production

Development 
In July 2021, Legends of Tomorrow cast member Caity Lotz announced that she had begun preparation to direct the series' 100th episode. While the episode's title was initially announced as "WVRDR_ERROR_100 <Oest-of-th3-Gs.gid30n> notFound", it was later amended to "wvrdr_error_100<oest-of-th3-gs.gid30n> not found". The episode, which is the seventh season's third, was written by showrunner Phil Klemmer and Matthew Maala.

Writing 
Klemmer explained the episode's structure: "The whole episode really is predicated on memory and Gideon's memory [...] It occurred to us, in being forced to do a retrospective of 100 episodes, that Gideon, really, is the only person who saw everything". The episode also features a "little bit of a reprise of a musical theater number".

Casting 
Main cast members Caity Lotz as Sara Lance / White Canary, Tala Ashe as Zari Tarazi, Jes Macallan as Ava Sharpe, Olivia Swann as Astra Logue, Adam Tsekhman as Gary Green, Shayan Sobhian as Behrad Tarazi, Lisseth Chavez as Esperanza "Spooner" Cruz, Amy Louise Pemberton as Gideon, and Nick Zano as Nate Heywood all return to star in the episodes from previous seasons. Many former main cast members return as guest stars; including Brandon Routh as Ray Palmer / Atom, Victor Garber as Martin Stein, Franz Drameh as Jefferson Jackson, Arthur Darvill as Rip Hunter, Courtney Ford as Nora Darhk, Wentworth Miller as Leonard Snart / Captain Cold, and Falk Hentschel as Carter Hall / Hawkman. Additionally, Raffi Barsoumian guest stars as Bishop. Routh returned for the episode, explaining that when he exited the series as a regular, it was a bad decision, while adding as a reason the need to show a more mature version of the character. Klemmer said he was interested in Ciara Renée, Dominic Purcell and Casper Crump reprising their roles as Kendra Saunders / Hawkgirl, Mick Rory / Heatwave and Vandal Savage, but ultimately did not cast them.

Filming 
Filming began on August 5, and ended later in the month.

Release 
"wvrdr_error_100<oest-of-th3-gs.gid30n> not found" premiered on October 27, 2021, on The CW. It was watched by 0.51 million viewers with a 0.1 share among adults aged 18 to 49.

Critical reception 
Jarrod Jones of The A.V. Club said the episode "does not explore the full spectrum of Legends' trajectory – moments from the middle seasons are left relatively dry – buts it's still a touching tribute to how Gideon and the crew have affected one another", and gave it a B+ rating. Writing for Game Rant, Bruno Savill De Jong rated the episode four stars out of five, saying it is a "surprisingly focused episode, considering the extend of cameos and memories it must cover. Although it doesn't quite have room for the whole ensemble to shine, it does delve into the messy heart that has become core to Legends".

References

External links 
 
 "wvrdr_error_100<oest-of-th3-gs.gid30n> not found" at Rotten Tomatoes

2021 American television episodes
Articles with underscores in the title
Legends of Tomorrow episodes
Television episodes directed by Caity Lotz